The term Iranian Intermezzo, or Persian Renaissance, represents a period in history which saw the rise of various native Iranian Muslim dynasties in the Iranian Plateau after the 7th-century Muslim conquest of Iran and the fall of Sasanian Empire. The term is noteworthy since it was an interlude between the decline of Abbāsid rule and power by Arabs and the "Sunni Revival" with the 11th-century emergence of the Seljuq Turks. The Iranian revival consisted of Iranian support based on Iranian territory and most significantly a revived Iranian national spirit and culture in an Islamic form. The Iranian dynasties and entities which comprise the Iranian Intermezzo are the Tahirids, Saffarids, Sajids, Samanids, Ziyarids, Buyids, Sallarids, Rawadids, Marwanids, Shaddadids, Kakuyids, Annazids and Hasanwayhids. 

According to the historian Alison Vacca (Cambridge University Press, 2017), the Iranian Intermezzo "in fact includes a number of other Iranian, mostly Kurdish, minor dynasties in the former caliphal provinces of Armenia, Albania, and Azerbaijan". The historian Clifford Edmund Bosworth states in the second edition of the Encyclopedia of Islam that Minorsky considers the Rawadids to be flourishing during the period of the Iranian intermezzo.

Muslim Iranian dynasties

Tahirids (821–873) 

The Tahirid dynasty, (Persian: سلسله طاهریان) was an Iranian Persian dynasty that ruled over the northeastern part of Greater Iran, in the region of Khorasan (made up of parts of present-day Iran, Afghanistan, Tajikistan, Turkmenistan, and Uzbekistan). The Tahirid capital was located in Nishapur.

Saffarids (861–1003) 
The Saffarid dynasty, was an Iranian Persian empire which ruled in Sistan (861–1003), a historical region in southeastern Iran and southwestern Afghanistan. Their capital was Zaranj.

Sajids (889–929) 
The Sajid dynasty, was an Islamic dynasty that ruled from 889–890 until 929. Sajids ruled Azerbaijan and parts of Armenia first from Maragha and Barda and then from Ardabil. The Sajids originated from the Central Asian province of Ushrusana and were of Iranian (Sogdians) heritage.

Samanids (875/819–999) 
The Samanid dynasty, also known as the Samanid Empire or simply Samanids (819–999) ( Sāmāniyān) was an Iranian empire in Central Asia and Greater Khorasan, named after its founder Saman Khuda who converted to Sunni Islam despite being from Zoroastrian theocratic nobility.

With their roots stemming from the city of Balkh (in present-day Afghanistan), the Samanids promoted the arts, giving rise to the advancement of science and literature, and thus attracted scholars such as Rudaki and Avicenna. While under Samanid control, Bukhara was a rival to Baghdad in its glory. Scholars note that the Samanids revived Persian more than the Buyids and the Saffarids, while continuing to patronize Arabic to a significant degree. Nevertheless, in a famous edict, Samanid authorities declared that "here, in this region, the language is Persian, and the kings of this realm are Persian kings."

Ziyarids (930–1090) 
The Ziyarid dynasty was an Iranian dynasty of Gilaki origin that ruled Tabaristan from 930 to 1090. At its greatest extent, it ruled much of present-day western and northern Iran.

Buyids (934–1062) 

Buyid dynasty, also known as the Buyid Empire or the Buyids ( Āl-e Buye, Caspian: Bowyiyün), also known as Buwaihids or Buyyids, were a Shī‘ah Persian dynasty that originated from Daylaman. They founded a confederation that controlled most of modern-day Iran and Iraq in the 10th and 11th centuries.
Indeed, as Dailamite Iranians the Būyids consciously revived symbols and practices of Persia's Sassānid dynasty. In fact, beginning with 'Adud al-Daula they used the ancient Sassānid title Shāhanshāh (Persian: شاهنشاه), literally meaning king of kings.

Sallarids (942–979) 
The Sallarid dynasty (also referred to as the Musafirids or Langarids) was an Islamic Persian dynasty principally known for its rule of Iranian Azerbaijan, Shirvan, and a part of Armenia from 942 until 979.

See also
 Shi'a Century
Nizari Ismaili state and the Nizari–Seljuk conflicts

References 

 
Medieval Azerbaijan
History of Central Asia
9th century in Iran
10th century in Iran
11th century in Iran
Medieval Iraq
Medieval Khorasan
Medieval Iranian Azerbaijan